Cheryl "Sher" Valenzuela is an American small-business owner and politician.  She was the Republican candidate for Lieutenant Governor of Delaware in 2012 and unsuccessfully ran for the Republican nomination for State Treasurer of Delaware in 2014.

Background
Valenzuela married her husband Eli and moved to Delaware in the early 1990s to care for her aging mother in neighboring New Jersey. She is a mother of three sons in a blended family, with Ian from her previous marriage, Simon from her current husband, and Pedro whom they adopted. Her second son, Simon, was diagnosed as autistic and Valenzuela describes the fight to overcome the negative prognosis as one of the reasons she would start her small business.

She and her husband are the vice president and president, respectively, of their own small business, First State Manufacturing, an industrial upholstery company based in Milford, Delaware. For her efforts and contributions to the Delaware economy, Valenzuela was awarded the Small Business Administration's Small Businessperson of the Year Award in 2012. First State Manufacturing employs approximately 60 people and provides a variety of goods ranging from seat covers for restaurants, to engine covers for the United States Air Force, to ballistic vests for the Israel Defense Forces.

Political career
In April 2012, Valenzuela was nominated by the Delaware Republican Party as its candidate for Lieutenant Governor. She ran against incumbent Democrat Matthew Denn and Libertarian challenger Margie Waite-McKeown.

On August 28, 2012, Valenzuela spoke at the 2012 Republican National Convention in Tampa, Florida. She spoke that night between fellow Republican women candidates Mia Love, the incumbent mayor of Saratoga Springs, Utah, and nominee for the U.S. House of Representatives in Utah's 2nd congressional district; and Cathy Rodgers, the incumbent U.S. Representative for Washington's 5th congressional district.

On November 6, 2012, the 2012 Delaware lieutenant gubernatorial election took place, where Valenzuela lost to incumbent Denn. She received 37.1% of the vote, versus Denn's 61.6%, and only held a lead in Sussex County, failing to receive a majority of votes in Kent County, New Castle County, or the greater Wilmington metropolitan area. Valenzuela, however, did lose by a smaller margin to her opponent than did any of the other statewide Republican candidates in the state.

In 2014, Valenzuela ran for State Treasurer of Delaware. She was defeated in the Republican primary by Ken Simpler following a contentious race marked by infighting and with outside spending behind both candidates, who frequently criticized each other.

Electoral history

See also

 List of people from Delaware

References

External links
 Sher Valenzuela for State Treasurer 2014
 Sher Valenzuela for Lieutenant Governor of Delaware (2012 campaign mirror archive from the WayBack Machine)
 First State Manufacturing

Year of birth missing (living people)
Place of birth missing (living people)
20th-century births
Candidates in the 2012 United States elections
Candidates in the 2014 United States elections
21st-century American politicians
2014 Delaware elections
Delaware Republicans
Living people
People from Milford, Delaware
Women in Delaware politics
21st-century American women politicians